Queensrÿche is the debut EP by the American progressive metal band Queensrÿche, released independently in 1982 through 206 Records and reissued later that next year through EMI-America. A remastered edition was reissued in 2003 through Capitol Records.

Background
In the early 1980s, Queensrÿche was known as The Mob, a cover band that played songs from popular heavy metal bands such as Iron Maiden and Judas Priest. Their line-up consisted of guitarists Chris DeGarmo and Michael Wilton, drummer Scott Rockenfield and bassist Eddie Jackson. Without a singer, they performed several shows with Geoff Tate, who at the time was the front man of the local band Babylon, and later of Myth. Tate chose not to join The Mob, because he was not interested in performing heavy metal covers.

Inspired by the positive responses from their performances at local rock festivals, The Mob decided to switch from playing cover songs to writing original music. The four members, who were between 17 and 19 years old, rehearsed five days a week in the basement of Rockenfield's parents, and took on at least two jobs each to earn enough money to record a 24-track demo tape. They booked the graveyard shifts from Monday through Friday at Triad Studios in Redmond, Washington, to record four songs. Tate was asked to join the band for the recording sessions, and in the same week write the lyrics to one unfinished song, which became "The Lady Wore Black". The whistle at the beginning of "The Lady Wore Black" was unintentional, as Brett Miller recalls: "Geoff needed to set the mood, so he had the lights turned off and sang with a single candle burning in the studio. While waiting for his first verse to come up, he whistled along with the opening guitar not realizing they were taping him. He told them it was a mistake, but everyone agreed it was cool, so they kept it."

Attempts to be signed to a label through the demo were unsuccessful. Kim and Diana Harris, the owners of Easy Street Records, ultimately offered The Mob a management contract. As the band name "The Mob" was not available, it was changed to "Queensrÿche". Kim Harris sent the demo tape and a band photo to a friend at the British music magazine Kerrang!, resulting in a glowing review and causing a growing buzz in both the United States and Europe, following which the Harrises released Queensrÿche's demo tape as a self-titled EP on their independent 206 Records label in 1983. After the EP garnered international praise, receiving much airplay and selling an unusual number of copies for a small independent release, Tate agreed to leave Myth and become Queensrÿche's permanent lead singer.

Kim Harris convinced EMI-America A&R manager Mavis Brodey to see Queensrÿche perform as the opening act for Zebra in Portland and Seattle on June 29–30, 1983. Brodey offered Queensrÿche a contract with EMI, spanning 15 years and encompassing seven albums. To support the EP, the band toured with Quiet Riot through the south and with Twisted Sister to the East Coast and Canada, and played in Seattle opening for Dio. After the tour had ended in November 1983, the band began preparations for their first studio album, The Warning.

Reissues
Shortly after Queensrÿche were signed, EMI re-released the EP Queensrÿche to moderate success, peaking at No. 81 on the Billboard charts. "Queen of the Reich" was released as a single.

The 1988 reissue by EMI saw the addition of a bonus track, "Prophecy", which was recorded during the Rage for Order sessions in 1985–86. This song was performed live by the band circa 1983, and was included on the 1984 Live in Tokyo home video. A demo version of "Prophecy" appears on the soundtrack for the movie The Decline of Western Civilization Part II: The Metal Years, and on the deluxe edition of Sign of the Times: The Best of Queensryche.

On the 2003 remastered edition, tracks 5–14 were live recordings of Queensrÿche's second performance in the tour supporting The Warning, held August 5, 1984, at the Nippon Seinenkan in Tokyo, Japan. The performance was previously released on VHS in 1984 as Live in Tokyo, but is now out of print.

Critical reception

In 2005, Queensrÿche was ranked number 336 in Rock Hard magazine's book The 500 Greatest Rock & Metal Albums of All Time.

AllMusic reviewer Eduardo Rivadavia noted an "obvious Iron Maiden influence" and the "'dungeons and dragons' lyrical themes" of the EP's songs. Rivadavia praised the song "The Lady Wore Black" for "display[ing] more maturity – a sign of things to come." Rivadavia concluded his review by saying "this is a must-have release for Queensrÿche fans."

Track listing

Tracks 5–14 recorded live at Nippon Seinenkan in Tokyo, Japan on August 5, 1984

Personnel
Queensrÿche
 Geoff Tate – lead vocals
 Michael Wilton – lead guitar
 Chris DeGarmo – rhythm guitar, backing vocals, lead guitar on "Queen of the Reich" and "The Lady Wore Black"
 Eddie Jackson – bass, backing vocals
 Scott Rockenfield – drums

Production
 Queensrÿche – production
 Tom Hall – engineering
 Ron Luder – mastering
 Neil Kernon – production (track 5)
 Wes Griswold - cover art, concept, illustrations

Charts

Certifications

References

1983 debut EPs
Queensrÿche albums
Queensrÿche EPs